Groningen City Hall is the seat of government in Groningen, the Netherlands. The city council meets in a modern room downstairs, but upstairs in the former raadszaal the Gulden Boek is kept that lists the honored citizens of the town.

History
The building was designed by the architect Jacob Otten Husly who won the commission in 1775 as the result of a prize competition that was set out by his personal friend, the council member and ex-amsterdam professor Petrus Camper. it was built during the years 1775-1810. In 1962, an attached building was designed and built by Jo Vegter. Most offices are currently located here.

Photo gallery.

References

External links

Gulden boek der stad Groningen

Buildings and structures in Groningen (city)
Groningen
Rijksmonuments in Groningen (province)
Government buildings completed in 1810